The A212 is an A road in South London, linking Lewisham to Croydon.

Route
It runs southwest from the South Circular at Catford, going through Sydenham, Norwood and Crystal Palace before heading south to Croydon. It then turns east to terminate at the A2022 road in Forestdale.

Vicar's Oak
The junction with the A214 at Crystal Palace is the meeting point of four London Boroughs – London Borough of Bromley, London Borough of Croydon, London Borough of Lambeth and London Borough of Southwark.  The Vicar's Oak, a tree which stood here from the 16th century was once the traditional marker of this boundary.

References

Roads in England
Streets in the London Borough of Croydon
Streets in the London Borough of Lewisham
Streets in the London Borough of Southwark